Katherine Fraser (born 9 April 2005) is a Scottish cricketer. In May 2019, she was named in Scotland's squad for the 2019 ICC Women's Qualifier Europe tournament in Spain. She made her Women's Twenty20 International (WT20I) for Scotland against Germany on 29 June 2019. At the age of 14 years and 81 days, she was the youngest female cricketer to represent Scotland in a WT20I match. At the time of her international debut, Fraser was a third year pupil at The Mary Erskine School in Edinburgh.

In August 2019, she was named in Scotland's squad for the 2019 Netherlands Women's Quadrangular Series. She played in Scotland's first match of the series, against Thailand on 8 August 2019. She finished the tournament as the joint-leading wicket-taker, with nine dismissals from six matches. Later the same month, she was named in Scotland's squad for the 2019 ICC Women's World Twenty20 Qualifier tournament in Scotland. On her selection for the tournament, Fraser said it was "really really exciting" and that "it's a great opportunity".

In January 2022, she was named in Scotland's team for the 2022 Commonwealth Games Cricket Qualifier tournament in Malaysia. In April 2022, it was announced that she would be training with Northern Diamonds for the upcoming season. Fraser is captaining the Scotland under-19 team at the 2023 ICC Under-19 Women's T20 World Cup in South Africa during January 2023.

References

External links
 

2005 births
Living people
Scottish women cricketers
Scotland women Twenty20 International cricketers
Place of birth missing (living people)
People educated at the Mary Erskine School
Cricketers from Edinburgh